Kudos: Rock Legend is a spinoff of the game Kudos. Unlike the previous Kudos game, however, this game allows the player to start his own rock/pop band.

Plot
The player begins as a vocalist with ambitions for becoming a rock star, setting a personal goal of achieving this in five years.  The player then must hold auditions for other bandmates, including a drummer, a bassist, and a guitarist (required to continue), as well as a keyboardist, and a saxophone player (optional) the player must write enough songs to fill a "setlist" allowing him to play "gigs" at a first limited but later expanded number of venues. Once a sufficient number of songs have been written, and enough money has been made, the player can create an album which can be sold at gigs, along with T-shirts, sweatshirts, and posters, for additional profit. Although the game is either won or lost after five years, gameplay is allowed to continue after that.

References

2007 video games
MacOS games
Music video games
North America-exclusive video games
Social simulation video games
Video games developed in the United Kingdom
Windows games
Positech Games games